This article contains a list of commercially available gene therapies.

Gene therapies

 Alipogene tiparvovec (Glybera): AAV-based treatment for lipoprotein lipase deficiency (no longer commercially available)
 Axicabtagene ciloleucel (Yescarta): treatment for large B-cell lymphoma
 Betibeglogene autotemcel (Zynteglo): treatment for beta thalassemia
 Brexucabtagene autoleucel (Tecartus): treatment for mantle cell lymphoma and acute lymphoblastic leukemia
 Cambiogenplasmid (Neovasculgen): treatment for vascular endothelial growth factor peripheral artery disease
 Ciltacabtagene autoleucel (Carvykti): treatment for multiple myeloma
 Elivaldogene autotemcel (Skysona): treatment for cerebral adrenoleukodystrophy
 Etranacogene dezaparvovec (Hemgenix): treatment for hemophilia B
 Gendicine: treatment for head and neck squamous cell carcinoma
 Idecabtagene vicleucel (Abecma): treatment for multiple myeloma
 Nadofaragene firadenovec (Adstiladrin): treatment for bladder cancer
 Onasemnogene abeparvovec (Zolgensma): AAV-based treatment for spinal muscular atrophy
 Strimvelis: treatment for adenosine deaminase deficiency (ADA-SCID)
 Talimogene laherparepvec (Imlygic): treatment for melanoma in patients who have recurring skin lesions
 Tisagenlecleucel (Kymriah): treatment for B cell lymphoblastic leukemia
 Valoctocogene roxaparvovec (Roctavian): treatment for hemophilia A
 Voretigene neparvovec (Luxturna): AAV-based treatment for Leber congenital amaurosis

See also 

 FDA-approved CAR T cell therapies

References

External links 
 

 
Applied genetics
Bioethics
Biotechnology
Medical genetics
Gene therapies
Gene delivery
Emerging technologies
Genetic engineering